Gold Plated is a 1976 album by the Climax Blues Band. It made No. 56 on the UK Albums Chart and No. 27 on the Billboard Album Chart, becoming their highest-selling album in either region. It also featured their hit "Couldn't Get It Right".

Track listing
The album was produced by Mike Vernon. All songs were written by the Climax Blues Band.

Personnel
Climax Blues Band
 Colin "Thunderguts" Cooper – saxophones, vocals, guitar
 Pete Haycock – guitar, vocals, 6-string bass
 Richard Jones – keyboards, vocals, guitar
 Derek Holt – Fender Jazz and Fender Precision basses, vocals
 John Cuffley – drums, percussion

References

1976 albums
Albums produced by Mike Vernon (record producer)
Climax Blues Band albums
RCA Records albums
Sire Records albums